The Ferndale Unified School District, oversees public education through grade 12, in Ferndale, California, and the surrounding area, including the "Ferndale bottoms" and an area of the Wildcat Hills in Humboldt County, California.

The district operates two schools: the Ferndale Elementary School (K–8), and Ferndale High School for grades 9 through 12. The school board has five members who meet monthly in the Ferndale High School library; agendas and board packets are available online. The superintendent/principal is Beth Anderson.

Ferndale Elementary School

The current Ferndale Elementary School is composed of several buildings: The main building was built in 1924, the gymnasium was built in 1967, and a multipurpose room, additional classrooms and computer space were added in 2001. All eighteen teachers are fully credentialed.

In 2013, forty percent of the 263 students enrolled were socioeconomically disadvantaged, 11% have to learn English and 24% of the students were non-White in ethnicity.

In the 2009–2010 school year, there were 340 students of whom 6% were English language learners and 20% were receiving free or reduced-price lunches, one measure of economic disadvantage. The Academic Performance Index (API) for Ferndale Elementary was 797 in 2008, 815, in 2009, 803 in 2010, 821 in 2011, 839 in 2012 and 791 in 2013. Compared to all the schools in Humboldt County for CST Scores in English, Ferndale Elementary ranks number 27 of 65. With the same schools comparing math scores, Ferndale Elementary ranks 25 of 63. By number of students, Ferndale Elementary ranks 18 of 100.

The sports teams are called "Ferndale Mustangs" with colors of green and white.

Ferndale High School
Ferndale High School is composed of several buildings. The main building was built in 1952 to provide offices, the school library and 11 classrooms. Other buildings include the 1975 gymnasium, and a building containing the woodshop and mechanics shop. All fourteen teachers are fully credentialled.

In 2012, there were 95 students of whom 24% were socioeconomically disadvantaged, 9% have to learn English and 21% were non-White in ethnicity.

In the 2009–2010 school year, there were 155 students of whom 1% were English language learners and 20% were receiving free or reduced-price lunches, one measure of economic disadvantage. The SAT scores of the 14 graduating seniors who took the test in 2009–2010 were 1508: math 526, reading 481, writing 500. Compared to the other High Schools in Humboldt County for highest average SAT scores, Ferndale High places sixth of nine. Compared to all the schools in Humboldt County for CST Scores in English, Ferndale High ranks 33 of 65. With the same schools comparing math scores, Ferndale High ranks 54 of 63. By number of students, Ferndale Elementary ranks 41 of 100.

The graduation rate at Ferndale High School in 2006-07 was 97.8% droppiing slightly the following academic year to 94.7%; there were no expulsions in any of the reported years.

The sports teams are called "Wildcats" with colors red and white.

Notable students

American football player and coach Len Casanova attended Ferndale schools in the 1920s where he played for the Wildcats.

U.S. Congressman Donald H. Clausen graduated Ferndale High where he was an honors student and lettered five sports: tennis, track, basketball, football and baseball as well as being the drum major of the school band.

Professional American baseball player Sam Dungan attended Ferndale schools in the 1890s.

American character actor Frank Ferguson grew up in Ferndale and attended local schools in the early 1900s.

Chef Guy Fieri started his first business "the Awesome Pretzel", selling pretzels from a cart, while a sixth-grade student at Ferndale Elementary School. In 2010 he worked on a video project with students from local schools.

Thomas E. Leavey, the co-founder of the Farmers Insurance Group attended local schools in the early 1900s.

American baseball player Joe Oeschger, and his brothers, attended local schools and played baseball for Ferndale High in the 1910s. Oeschger pitched the longest ever baseball game which is memorialized with a plaque at Ferndale Fireman's Park baseball field.

See also
 List of schools in Humboldt County, California

References

 

School districts in Humboldt County, California